Olga Rypakova (née Alekseyeva; 30 November 1984) is a Kazakhstani track and field athlete. Originally a heptathlete, she switched to focus on the long jump and began to compete in the triple jump after 2007. Her first successes came in the combined events at Asian competitions – she won the women's pentathlon at the 2005 Asian Indoor Games and took the heptathlon gold at the 2006 Asian Games the following year.

She competed in both jumping events at the 2008 Beijing Olympics and finished fourth in the triple jump with an Asian record of 15.11 metres. Rypakova has represented Kazakhstan at the 2007 and 2009 World Championships in Athletics. She reached the world podium for the first time at the 2010 IAAF World Indoor Championships, where she took gold with an Asian indoor record jump of 15.14 m. She won the gold medal in triple jump at the 2012 London Olympics.

In February 2023, Rypakova announced the end of her professional sports career.

Career

Early career
Born in Ust-Kamenogorsk, she entered her first world junior competition at the age of sixteen and finished eleventh in the long jump qualifying round of the 2000 World Junior Championships in Athletics. She was more successful in the heptathlon: she finished fourth at the 2001 World Youth Championships in Athletics and went on to take the silver at the following year's World Junior Championships behind the emerging Carolina Klüft. Rypakova also became Kazakhstan's national heptathlon champion that year. She persisted with combined events and started competing on the international circuit, finishing fifth with a season's best at the Multistars competition in 2003, and she became the national indoor champion in the women's pentathlon in 2004.

Rypakova's first major championships appearances came in 2005: in September she took part in the long jump at the 2005 Asian Athletics Championships in Incheon, finishing in fourth place. Two months later she won her first gold, topping the podium in the indoor pentathlon at the 2005 Asian Indoor Games. Continuing in the pentathlon, she went on to win the gold at the 2006 Asian Indoor Athletics Championships setting an Asian and championships record of 4582 points for the event. Reaching the indoor world stage for the first time, she attended the 2006 IAAF World Indoor Championships but she did not improve further and took seventh place with 4368 points.

She represented Asia for the first time at the 2006 IAAF World Cup team competition, although she managed only 6.21 m in the long jump competition, finishing in eighth. She made improvements, however, in the weeks following the World Cup by jumping 6.63 m (a new personal best) for second place at the Colorful Daegu Athletics Meeting. She pushed herself beyond the normal seven events at the 2006 Asian Games by winning the heptathlon gold medal with 5955 points, and then participating in the individual long jump competition. She won the long jump bronze medal a day after topping the podium in the heptathlon competition.

Major championship gold

A quick succession of major competitions defined her 2007 season. She began by scoring two golds in the horizontal jumps at the 2007 Asian Athletics Championships in July, which included a championship record and national record of 14.69 m in the triple jump. In August at the 2007 Summer Universiade, she brought her country its first ever athletics gold medal at the competition with a personal best of 6.85 m in the long jump.

Three weeks later, she took part in her first ever World Championships in Athletics: she opted to contest the triple jump and she finished fourth in the qualifying. However, she could not match that performance in the final round and finished in eleventh overall. She intended to close the year with an appearance at the 2007 Asian Indoor Games but she withdrew from the competition.

Her 2008 season began with further indoor success: she won her second gold and set her second championship record at the 2008 Asian Indoor Athletics Championships, this time in the triple jump with a mark of 14.23 m. The 2008 IAAF World Indoor Championships followed shortly and she came close to the podium in the triple jump competition but while her jump of 14.58 m was enough to set an indoor Asian record, it was not enough to push Marija Šestak out of the bronze medal position. Similar bitter-sweet results awaited her at the 2008 Summer Olympics, her first time representing Kazakhstan at the Summer Olympics. She entered both the horizontal jump competitions and recorded a new Asian record of 15.11 m in the Olympic triple jump contest. In spite of this, she remained some ten centimetres behind the bronze medallist Hrysopiyi Devetzi of Greece. Her Olympics came to a close after a modest set of jumps in the qualifiers of the long jump competition left her out of the final.

She took part in her second outdoor world championships the following year, but she could not match her previous form at finished in tenth place overall in the 2009 women's triple jump competition with a best mark of 13.91 m. Despite this lacklustre performance on the world stage, she remained dominant in continental competition and won both the long jump and triple jump gold medals at the 2009 Asian Indoor Games (setting two Games records and helping Kazakhstan top the athletics medal table in the process). Competing at her final championships of that year, she retained her triple jump title at the 2009 Asian Athletics Championships, beating Xu Tingting and Irina Litvinenko with a jump of 14.53 m.

8 November 2012 Kazakhstan London Olympic champion Olga Rypakova got the Olympic Council of Asia award  as the best Asian athlete, along with Zulfiya Chinshanlo and Ilya Ilyin.

World indoor champion
She became the long and triple jump national indoor champion at the beginning of 2010, and she opted to compete in the triple jump at the 2010 IAAF World Indoor Championships. She completed a series of personal best jumps in the final, battling against the defending champion Yargelis Savigne for the gold medal. Having sealed first place with a fourth round jump of 14.93 m and being relieved of the competitive pressure, her final jump saw her reach a new level: she jumped 15.14 m – a result that placed her as the third longest jumper indoors after former world champions Ashia Hansen and Tatyana Lebedeva.

Achievements

Personal bests
Her personal best long jump is 6.85 metres, achieved at the 2007 Universiade in Bangkok. In the triple jump she has a best of 15.25 metres, achieved at the 2010 IAAF Continental Cup in Split; this is the Asian record for the event. She also holds the current Asian indoor record in the triple jump with a mark of 15.14 m, achieved at the 2010 IAAF World Indoor Championships. Her best of 4582 points in the indoor pentathlon is also an Asian indoor record. She has a heptathlon best of 6113 points, set in Almaty in 2006.

All information taken from IAAF profile.

References

External links

1984 births
Living people
Sportspeople from Oskemen
Kazakhstani heptathletes
Kazakhstani female long jumpers
Kazakhstani female triple jumpers
Olympic athletes of Kazakhstan
Olympic gold medalists for Kazakhstan
Olympic silver medalists for Kazakhstan
Olympic bronze medalists for Kazakhstan
Olympic gold medalists in athletics (track and field)
Olympic silver medalists in athletics (track and field)
Olympic bronze medalists in athletics (track and field)
Athletes (track and field) at the 2008 Summer Olympics
Athletes (track and field) at the 2012 Summer Olympics
Athletes (track and field) at the 2016 Summer Olympics
Athletes (track and field) at the 2020 Summer Olympics
Medalists at the 2008 Summer Olympics
Medalists at the 2012 Summer Olympics
Medalists at the 2016 Summer Olympics
Asian Games gold medalists for Kazakhstan
Asian Games silver medalists for Kazakhstan
Asian Games bronze medalists for Kazakhstan
Asian Games gold medalists in athletics (track and field)
Asian Games medalists in athletics (track and field)
Athletes (track and field) at the 2006 Asian Games
Athletes (track and field) at the 2010 Asian Games
Athletes (track and field) at the 2014 Asian Games
Athletes (track and field) at the 2018 Asian Games
Medalists at the 2006 Asian Games
Medalists at the 2010 Asian Games
Medalists at the 2014 Asian Games
Medalists at the 2018 Asian Games
World Athletics Championships medalists
World Athletics Championships athletes for Kazakhstan
Universiade gold medalists for Kazakhstan
Medalists at the 2007 Summer Universiade
Universiade medalists in athletics (track and field)
Diamond League winners
World Athletics Indoor Championships winners
IAAF Continental Cup winners